John Kulasalu (born 1956) is an Australian retired swimmer who won a silver medal in the  freestyle relay at the 1973 World Aquatics Championships.

References

1956 births
Living people
Australian male freestyle swimmers
World Aquatics Championships medalists in swimming
Swimmers at the 1974 British Commonwealth Games
Commonwealth Games medallists in swimming
Commonwealth Games gold medallists for Australia
Australian people of Estonian descent
Medallists at the 1974 British Commonwealth Games